The Memphis Grays were a minor league baseball team from Memphis, Tennessee, that played in the Class B Southern League in 1886 and 1888. The team finished the 1886 season in fourth place with a 43–46 (.483) record. In 1888, the team finished second with a 26–24 (.520) record.

References 

Southern League (1885–1899) teams
Baseball teams established in 1886
Baseball teams disestablished in 1888
G
Professional baseball teams in Tennessee
1886 establishments in Tennessee
1888 disestablishments in Tennessee
Defunct baseball teams in Tennessee